Me Him Her is a 2015 American comedy film written and directed by Max Landis, in his directorial debut. The film stars Luke Bracey, Dustin Milligan, and Emily Meade. The film had its world premiere at the Seattle International Film Festival on June 5, 2015. The film was released in a limited release and through video on demand on March 11, 2016, by FilmBuff.

Plot 
Twentysomething drifter Cory arrives in Los Angeles to help his semi-famous TV star friend Brendan take his first steps out of "The Closet".

Cast
 Luke Bracey as Brendan Ehrlick
 Dustin Milligan as Cory Isaacson
 Emily Meade as Gabbi
 Angela Sarafyan as Heather
 Geena Davis as Mrs. Ehrlick
 Scott Bakula as Mr. Ehrlick
 Alia Shawkat as Laura
 Jake McDorman as Griffin
 Rebecca Drysdale as Kris
 Casey Wilson as Cynthia
 Kyle Bornheimer as Steve
 Miles Fisher as Scotty
 Frank Cappello as "Scrot" Dobfim
 Chris Hardwick as "Culk" Didip
 Kyle Mooney as "Moot" Morezit
 Haley Joel Osment as Himself
 Lance Henriksen as The Stranger

Production
In November 2012, it was announced that Max Landis would direct the film in his directorial debut, for Big Beach Films, with production planned to begin in spring or summer 2013. It was also announced that Peter Saraf and Marc Turtletaub will produce the film. In July 2013, it was announced that Luke Bracey, Dustin Milligan, and Emily Meade had been cast in the film. In August 2013, it was announced that Angela Sarafyan had been cast in the film as Heather Frost. In October 2013, it was announced that Haley Joel Osment had been cast in the film, appearing as a fictionalized version of himself. Scott Bakula and Geena Davis also co-star as Brendan's parents.
According to set costumer, Tasha Goldthwait, Max Landis created a hostile workplace that included sexual assault and harassment. Landis quickly began subjecting Goldthwait to what she described as "physical, sexual, and verbal abuse." "He would talk about his penis all the time to me, brag about the size of it." She continued, "On set he would touch me all the time, he would pick me up and turn me upside down and carry me around set. My shirt would come above my face and I'd be exposed. At one point we were on set with people around and he pushed me down and got on top of me on a bed. I raised my voice and told him to get off of me, and eventually managed to get him off."

Release
The film has received mixed reviews from critics, receiving a 50% rating on Rotten Tomatoes. The film had its world premiere at the Seattle International Film Festival on June 5, 2015. In January 2016, FilmBuff acquired distribution rights to the film. The film was released in a limited release and through video on demand on March 11, 2016.

References

External links
 

2015 films
2015 comedy films
American comedy films
Films with screenplays by Max Landis
Films directed by Max Landis
Big Beach (company) films
2015 directorial debut films
2010s English-language films
2010s American films